Tetyana Filonyuk or Tetiana Filoniuk (born April 5, 1984 in Novoselytsia) is  a Ukrainian long-distance runner who specialises in marathon running.

Achievements

References
 

1984 births
Living people
Ukrainian female long-distance runners
Athletes (track and field) at the 2008 Summer Olympics
Athletes (track and field) at the 2012 Summer Olympics
Olympic athletes of Ukraine
European Athletics Championships medalists
Ukrainian female marathon runners
Competitors at the 2009 Summer Universiade
Sportspeople from Chernivtsi Oblast